Christian Leichner (born March 11, 1982 in Córdoba, Argentina) is an Argentine center forward  currently playing for Tiro Federal de Morteros of the torneo argentino "B" in Argentina.

Teams
  Racing de Córdoba 2002-2003
  Universitario de Córdoba 2004-2005
  Deportivo Maipú 2005
  Escuela Presidente Roca 2006
  9 de Julio (Río Tercero) 2006
  Sportivo Patria 2007
  Talleres de Perico 2007-2008
  General Paz Juniors 2008-2009
  Unión de Sunchales 2009-2010
  Gimnasia y Esgrima de Mendoza 2011
  Sport Huancayo 2011
  Naval 2012
  Tiro Federal de Morteros 2013–present

References
 
 

1982 births
Living people
Argentine footballers
Argentine expatriate footballers
Gimnasia y Esgrima de Mendoza footballers
Racing de Córdoba footballers
Sport Huancayo footballers
Naval de Talcahuano footballers
Primera B de Chile players
Expatriate footballers in Chile
Expatriate footballers in Peru
Talleres de Perico footballers
Association football forwards
Footballers from Córdoba, Argentina